Giovanni Battista Bugatti (1779–1869) was the official executioner for the Papal States from 1796 to 1864. He was the longest-serving executioner in the States and was nicknamed Mastro Titta, a Roman corruption of maestro di giustizia, or master of justice. At the age of 85, he was retired by Pope Pius IX with a monthly pension of 30 scudi.

Biography 
Bugatti's career in charge of executions lasted 68 years and began when he was 17 years old, on 22 March 1796; and lasted until 1864. Up until 1810, the method of execution was beheading by axe, hanging or mallet. The French introduced the use of the guillotine, which was continued after the Papal States regained their sovereignty (the first Papal guillotining occurred in 1816) until the last executions. Over the 68 years he worked as official executioner, Bugatti carried out a total of 514 executions, an average of 7 per year (in his notebook, Bugatti noted 516 names of executed but two prisoners are subtracted, one because he was shot and the other because he was hanged and quartered by the adjutant).

Bugatti is described as being short and portly, and always well dressed. He frequented the church Santa Maria in Traspontina. He was married but had no children. When not carrying out his official duties, Bugatti and his wife sold painted umbrellas and other souvenirs to tourists. He referred to his executions as justices and the condemned as patients.

He could not leave the Trastevere neighborhood unless on official business. Officially this was for his own protection, in case relatives of those he had executed decided to take revenge against him. Unofficially it was probably due to superstition regarding his part-time job. On his crossing the bridge, the residents of Rome were alerted that an execution was about to take place and people would gather to witness the popular event.

One of his executions, carried out on 8 March 1845, was described by Charles Dickens in his work Pictures from Italy (1846).

His blood-stained clothes, axes and guillotines are on display at the Museum of Criminology at Via del Gonfalone in Rome. The guillotine is of a very peculiar build, with straight blade and V-shaped neck-piece.

The Church and the Death Penalty
The application of the death penalty within the Papal States (and beyond on the recommendation of ecclesiastical administrators) and its justification have a long history. Most notorious in this regard was the action of the Inquisition in its struggle against alleged heretics. Other suspects such as highwaymen and murderers were also sentenced to death by ecclesiastical courts.

In 1952, Pope Pius XII stated: "Even when it is a question of the execution of a condemned man, the State does not dispose of the individual’s right to life. In this case it is reserved to the public power to deprive the condemned person of the enjoyment of life in expiation of his crime when, by his crime, he has already disposed himself of his right to live."

Pope John Paul II, who in his encyclical Evangelium Vitae of 25 March 1995 rejected the death penalty, although he still spoke of a possible justification of executions in order to "defend society", would later become a fierce opponent of the death penalty, describing it to be "cruel and unnecessary".

Pope Francis has strongly and repeatedly condemned the death penalty, which he views as "contrary to the Gospel" and "inadmissible in all cases". According to Francis, the death penalty, regardless of the means and the reasons, intrinsically denies the human dignity of the condemned: "It must be clearly stated that the death penalty is an inhumane measure that, regardless of how it is carried out, abases human dignity,” the Pope declared, adding that, “doctrine cannot be preserved without allowing it to develop, nor can it be tied to an interpretation that is rigid and immutable without demeaning the working of the Holy Spirit.” 

Concerning the previous stance of the Church about the death penalty, Francis’ philosophy stipulates that the Church is always a community on a journey and development: "For Francis, the Church is not a set of rules or static teachings, but rather a community on a journey. Catholics do not possess the fullness of the mystery of God, but over time we come to understand it better, as Pope John XXIII recognized. To be faithful to God, the Church’s teachings must reflect this growth or development in understanding."

References

He executed justice. Retrieved 11 April 2005
Mastro Titta. Retrieved 14 July 2005.
. Retrieved 14 July 2005.
When Mastro Titta Crossed the Bridge

Executioners
People of the Papal States
1779 births
1869 deaths
18th-century Italian people
19th-century Italian people